Shattuck Avenue is a major city street running north–south through Berkeley, California, and Oakland, California. At its southern end, the street branches from Telegraph Avenue in Oakland's Temescal district, then ends at Indian Rock Park in the Berkeley Hills to the north.  Shattuck Avenue is the main street of Berkeley, forming the spine of that city's downtown, and the site of the Gourmet Ghetto in North Berkeley. The street was named for Francis Kittredge Shattuck, an early landowner and booster who later served as Mayor of Oakland.  Shattuck was largely responsible for the original construction of the road as well as for a railroad built along its route.

History
During the Mexican era, a trail or road ran between the homes of the Peralta brothers, Domingo and Vicente.  Domingo made his home along Codornices Creek near what is today the intersection of Sacramento and Hopkins Streets in Berkeley.  Vicente's home was situated along Temescal Creek near what is today the intersection of 55th Street and Telegraph Avenue in North Oakland.  The route of this early predecessor road, which came to be called the "Temescal Road", is depicted on the first official plat map of the area, Kellersberger's Map.  A trace of it survives today as Racine Avenue in North Oakland.

During the 1850s, Francis Shattuck and three others laid claim to four adjoining strips of land in what is now downtown Berkeley.  The dividing line between the parcels claimed by Shattuck and his brother-in-law George Blake became the alignment of a new county road whose construction the Board of Supervisors assigned to Francis Shattuck, a member of the board.  The new road was laid out from where Strawberry Creek intersected the old Temescal Road, thence along the new alignment, extending southward to a gore point intersection with the Telegraph Road (today's Telegraph Avenue).  The road became known as "Shattuck's Road".  Francis Shattuck built his new home above the north bank of Strawberry Creek at the northern terminus of the county road, which was also the northern bound of Shattuck's claim, along the alignment of what is now Addison Street.  The creek and Shattuck's home were situated along what is now Allston Way.

In 1866, the College Homestead Association, an organization established to raise funds for the new site of the College of California, filed a plat map with the object of selling parcels of land near the site of the present University of California.  This map proposed names for several streets in a grid pattern, incorporating the alignment of Shattuck's Road, but designating it "Guyot Street".  The name never stuck.  By the time of the incorporation of the Town of Berkeley in 1878, Shattuck's Road had become Shattuck Avenue.  By that time also, it had been extended northward to Rose Street.  Additionally, the Central Pacific, at Shattuck's urging, had constructed its Berkeley Branch Railroad which merged into Shattuck at Adeline Avenue.  In later years, this line was assigned to the Southern Pacific and eventually electrified and extended.  Streetcars and transbay trains of the competing Key System also ran on Shattuck in Berkeley.

Overview
In North Berkeley, Shattuck Avenue is the location of the Gourmet Ghetto, an unofficial district known for its density of restaurants. From there the street leads south to Downtown Berkeley.

Shattuck is an important north–south arterial roadway for northern Alameda County connecting the downtowns of Berkeley and Oakland. In the early 20th century the road included commuter train and streetcar tracks. Today BART carries commuters on the system's second-most popular line underneath the pavement. This includes the Ashby and Downtown Berkeley stations. The Downtown Berkeley is one of BART's most frequented stations and a transit hub for AC Transit and Bear Transit buses.

The street is used to access the major employers and educational institutions located along it including the University of California, Berkeley City College, Berkeley High School, CALPIRG, the PowerBar headquarters and other downtown office towers. The downtown length is home to many anchor and small retailers in addition to being a bustling restaurant district.

The street is a major gathering place for protestors, as it is effectively the city's Main Street and connects with other major arterials including Ashby Avenue, University Avenue, and Telegraph Avenue. It was also the site of the Berkeley Marine Corps Recruiting Center protests and features a pink-colored curb reserved for protesting parking. Further south the street is the home to La Peña Cultural Center, the nation's Chilean American cultural capitol.

See also

References

External links

Streets in Berkeley, California
Streets in Oakland, California
Articles with WikiMiniAtlas displaying incorrectly; WMA not showing route